Paskal Mitrevski (1912–1978), also known as Paskal Mitrovski or Paschalis Mitropoulos, was a communist partisan and former President of the Macedonian National Liberation Front, founded in Greece by the Slavic Macedonian minority after the Second World War.

Early life
Mitrevski was born in 1912 in the Kastorian village of Čuka (Chuka), then in the Ottoman Empire, today Archangelos, Greece.

Involvement with the National Liberation Front

In 1943 Mitrevski joined the Slavic-Macedonian National Liberation Front until it was disbanded in 1944. On April 23, 1945, he founded the Narodno Osloboditelen Front or National Liberation Front (NOF) along with Mihajlo Keramitčiev, Georgi Urdov, Atanas Korovešov, Pavle Rakovski and Minčo Fotev. He soon became the representative of NOF to the Greek Communist Party (KKE) and Democratic Army of Greece. On September 13, 1946, Mitrevski wrote a letter in which he stated "We did not leave a single issue unresolved or in the dark" in regards to the Macedonian issue and the existence of the National Liberation Front. By this time Mitrevski had entered talks with Markos Vafiadis regarding the complete merger of the Communist Party and the National Liberation Front. This was achieved but the National Liberation Front remained a semi-autonomous entity within the KKE.

Mitrevski was a staunch supporter of the NOF and criticised the regional leadership of the KKE. Eventually a rift occurred between Mitrevski and Mihajlo Keramitčiev and many factions of the National Liberation Front were divided. This was in turn over the dismissal of NOF leaders such as Vangel Ajanovski-Oče and Lambro Colakov from the Executive Council by General Ioannidis. In turn this matter was taken to the Politburo of the party on February 20–21, 1948 where Mitrevski and the leader of the "Anti-Fascist Women's Front", Vera Nikolova, publicly criticised each other. As it was obvious that the party was in serious internal strife, Mitrevski proposed that Stavros Kochopoulos become leader of the party rather than Mihajlo Keramitčiev, who had the support of rival factions. Soon mistrust and suspicion grew about Mitrevski's role in NOF and the Communist Party. Many claimed that he was "motivated solely by his own personal ambitions". He attended the general meeting of the politburo on July 10 which adopted a motion denouncing the NOF and indirectly the Macedonian contribution to the war effort; Mitrevski refuted these claims but to no avail. The fits which had occurred between him and Keramitčiev was seen as potentially fatal to the party and he was removed as leader of NOF on August 8, 1948. Stavros Kochopoulos officially became president while Vangel Kojčev was made secretary. By December, however, it had been decided by Nikos Zachariadis that the membership of the secretariat should be expanded and Mitrevski was reinstated. On the initiative of Zachariadis, Mitrevski was reinstated as President of the National Liberation Front on April 1, 1949.

Minister in the Provisional Government

Four days after his reinstatement as President of the National Liberation Front on April 5, 1949, Paskal Mitrevski was appointed as the Minister for Food in the Provisional Government along with Krste Kačev who was appointed as the Director of National Minorities in the Ministry of the Interior. By mid 1949 only one of the three major factions in the NOF was in support of Mitrevski. 

After the collapse of the Democratic Army of Greece, Mitrevski fled to Bureli, Albania, where was arrested on October 3, 1949, on accusations that he was an "agent of Tito". He was transferred to Moscow, where in 1952 he was sentenced by the Supreme Court of the USSR to 25 years in prison. But in the spring of 1956 he was released, and the following year his sentence was annulled. During 1957 he left for Communist Yugoslavia. On June 26, 1963, he was elected as a judge of the newly established Constitutional Court of SR Macedonia.

He died on February 10, 1978, in Skopje.

References

See also

National Liberation Front (Macedonia)
Slavic-Macedonian National Liberation Front

1912 births
1978 deaths
Slavic speakers of Greek Macedonia
Macedonian communists
People from Kastoria (regional unit)